Agence nationale de l'aviation civile may refer to:

Agence nationale de l'aviation civile (Burkina Faso)
Agence nationale de l'aviation civile du Bénin
Agence nationale de l'aviation civile (Republic of the Congo)
Agence nationale de l'aviation civile du Gabon
Agence nationale de l'aviation civile du Mali
National Civil Aviation Agency (Mauritania)
Agence nationale de l'aviation civile (Niger)
Agence nationale de l'aviation civile du Sénégal
Agence nationale de l'aviation civile du Togo

See also 
Agence Nationale de l'Aviation Civil (disambiguation)